Alfie Hewett defeated Joachim Gérard in the final, 6–4, 4–6, 6–3 to win the men's singles wheelchair tennis title at the 2020 French Open. It was his second French Open singles title and fourth major singles title overall.

Gustavo Fernández was the defending champion, but was defeated by Hewett in the semifinals.

Seeds

Draw

Finals

References

External Links
 Draw

Wheelchair Men's Singles
French Open, 2020 Men's Singles